Marasmarcha fauna is a moth of the family Pterophoridae. It is found in France and Italy. It has recently been recorded from Spain.

The larvae feed on  spiny restharrow (Ononis spinosa).

References

Exelastini
Moths described in 1876
Plume moths of Europe
Taxa named by Pierre Millière